Kennett Square Historic District is a national historic district located in Kennett Square, Chester County, Pennsylvania. It encompasses 507 contributing buildings in the central business district and surrounding residential areas of Kennett Square. They are mostly residential and commercial structures built between 1875 and 1924 and in a variety of popular architectural styles including Colonial Revival, Victorian, and Federal.  Notable non-residential buildings include the American Road Machinery complex, Kennett Consolidated School, New Century Club, Baptist church, St. Patrick's Parochial School, former Episcopal Church of the Advent, Friends Home,  Bernard Building, and Municipal Building.

It was added to the National Register of Historic Places in 1989.

References

Historic districts on the National Register of Historic Places in Pennsylvania
Federal architecture in Pennsylvania
Colonial Revival architecture in Pennsylvania
Historic districts in Chester County, Pennsylvania
National Register of Historic Places in Chester County, Pennsylvania
Kennett Square, Pennsylvania